Dwight Edwards (born June 16, 1954)  was a Canadian Football League wide receiver and kick returner who played eleven seasons for five different teams. His family emigrated from Jamaica to Canada and settled in Mississauga, Ontario.

External links
 Career Bio

1954 births
Living people
Canadian football wide receivers
Canadian football return specialists
Toronto Argonauts players
Saskatchewan Roughriders players
Ottawa Rough Riders players
Calgary Stampeders players
Montreal Concordes players
Jamaican emigrants to Canada
Jamaican players of Canadian football
Players of Canadian football from Ontario
Black Canadian players of Canadian football
People from Manchester Parish
Sportspeople from Mississauga